Kalyanamam Kalyanam (lit.:Marriage like Marriage) is a Tamil-language family soap opera starring Pragya Nagra, Subramanian Gopalakrishnan, Sailatha, T. S. B. K. Moulee and R. Sundarrajan. It started airing on 29 January 2018 on Vijay TV It is the first time Sreethu and Teja are paired together. The show is directed by Bramma. The plot and names were partly inspired from the Tamil movie Kadhal Kottai. A sequel series named Anjali premiered on 25 February 2019 replacing this series.

Plot
The story starts with introduction of Kamali and Suriya. They both have two different worlds. Kamali living in Kothagiri, wants to get married and live her life happily with her husband full of love just like her parents, while Suriya in Chennai thinks marriage is just one more burden in life which will only hurt people's life based on his experience in his parents' divorced life. Suriya's grandfather Siva wants him to marry and looks for alliance and wants him and his parents to meet Kamali. Suriya and his parents arrive at Kamali's home. Suriya asks Kamali about divorce in their first talk. This creates bad impression of Suriya among her family members.

Cast

Main
 Tejas Gowda (Ep: 1-301) / Subramanian Gopalakrishnan (Ep: 302-307) as Suriya
 Sreethu Nair (Ep: 1-301) / Pragya Nagra (Ep: 302-307) as Kamali Suriya
 Niharika (Ep: 1-68) / Srithika (Ep: 69-210) / Sailatha (Ep: 211-307) as Akhila, Suriya's mother

Supporting
 T. S. B. K. Moulee as Sivaprakasham - Surya and Madhan's grandfather and Akhila, Jagadish and Sandhya's father
 R. Sundarrajan as Kamali's grandfather
 Jeeva Ravi / Prakash Rajan as Dr. Chandrasekhar, Suriya's father
 Shabnam as Priya, Kamali's cousin
 Premi Venkat as Priya's mother in law
 Baby George as Kalyani (Priya's mother, Kamali's aunt)
 Sai Priyanka Ruth as Sandhya. Akhila's sister and Surya's aunt
 Jeevitha as Nirmala Jagadish
 --- as Jagadish (Nirmala's husband)
 Gokul Menon as Madhan (Nirmala's son)
 Aishwarya Salimath as Swetha Madhan (Madhan's wife)
 Uma Rani as 'Pookadai' Bhuvana (Swetha's mother)
 Ravikumar
 Sripriya as Thenmozhi (Kamali's mother)
 Bharathi Mohan as Kamali's uncle
 Mridhula Sree

Casting
The series is a family story. Sreethu, formerly of the series 7C and Mella Thirandhathu Kadhavu played the lead female role, later to be replaced by Pragya Nagra. Teja who made his debut in the Kannada film One Time, played the male lead role of Suriya, later to be replaced by Subramanian Gopalakrishnan. Tamil Film director and Actors T. S. B. K. Moulee and R. Sundarrajan are also part of the serial and  play important roles.

Title song

Soundtrack

References

External links
Official website at Hotstar

Star Vijay original programming
Tamil-language romance television series
2010s Tamil-language television series
2018 Tamil-language television series debuts
Tamil-language television shows
2019 Tamil-language television series endings